John Holms JP, DL (21 September 1830 – 31 March 1891), was a Scottish businessman and Liberal politician.

Background
Holms was the son of James Holms of Sancel Bank, Paisley, and his wife Janet Love, daughter of James Love, of Paisley. His brother William Holms was MP for Paisley.

Career
Holms was a partner in W. Holms Bros, spinners, of Glasgow.

He was elected Member of Parliament for  Hackney in 1860, and served in the second Liberal administration of William Ewart Gladstone as a Junior Lord of the Treasury from 1880 to 1882 and as Parliamentary Secretary to the Board of Trade from 1882 to 1885. When Hackney  was divided into single-member constituencies in 1885 John stood for the Central division. He was defeated by his Conservative opponent by 193 votes. Just a few days later he was seriously injured in an accident on the London Underground and rendered an invalid for the remainder of his life.

He was also a Justice of the Peace for Lanarkshire, Middlesex and Westminster and a Deputy Lieutenant for Tower Hamlets. He was the author of military books including The British Army in 1875 and Our Military Difficulty.

Personal life
Holms married Elizabeth Lyon, daughter of Edward Lyon of Kennington in 1856. He died in March 1891, aged 60.

References

External links
 

Brief biography at portcullis.parliament.uk
Parliamentary Archives, Papers of John Holms

1830 births
1891 deaths
Liberal Party (UK) MPs for English constituencies
Hackney Members of Parliament
UK MPs 1868–1874
UK MPs 1874–1880
UK MPs 1880–1885
Parliamentary Secretaries to the Board of Trade